Nigel Paul Hackett (born 22 August 1962) is a former English cricketer. Hackett was a right-handed batsman who bowled left-arm medium-fast. He was born in Stowbridge, Norfolk.

Hackett made his debut for Staffordshire in the 1991 MCCA Knockout Trophy against Oxfordshire. Hackett played Minor counties cricket for Staffordshire from 1991 to 1993, which included 25 Minor Counties Championship matches and 12 MCCA Knockout Trophy matches. In 1991, he made his List A debut for Staffordshire against Northamptonshire in the NatWest Trophy. He made 3 further appearances in List A cricket for the county, the last coming against Surrey in the 1994 NatWest Trophy. In his 4 List A matches for the county, he took 4 wickets at an average of 39.00, with best figures of 3/45. He made 2 List A appearances for the Minor Counties cricket team in the 1992 Benson & Hedges Cup against Sussex and Leicestershire. In these matches, he took 4 wickets for the team at an average of 23.75, with best figures of 3/55.

References

External links
Nigel Hackett at ESPNcricinfo
Nigel Hackett at CricketArchive

1962 births
Living people
People from Stow Bardolph
English cricketers
Staffordshire cricketers
Minor Counties cricketers